Raukaua simplex is a species of evergreen plant in the Araliaceae family. This species is native to New Zealand. The species occurs in certain lowland, montane and subalpine forests from the Waihou River southward to Stewart Island and the Auckland Islands. An example occurrence in Westland forests includes associates such as Cyathea smithii and Dicksonia squarrosa.

Taxonomy
Raukaua simplex was first described in 1786 by Georg Forster as Panax simplex in Florulae Insularum Australium Prodromus. In 1997, Mitchell, Frodin and Heads redescribed it, assigning it to the genus, Raukaua, thus naming it Raukaua simplex.

References

simplex
Flora of New Zealand
Flora of the Auckland Islands
Plants described in 1786